Shamshir-e Zomorrodnegār ('the Emerald-Studded sword') is a sword in the Persian legend Shahnameh. The witch mother of a hideous horned demon called Fulad-zereh used a charm to make his body invulnerable to all weapons except this specific sword.

Shamshir-e Zomorrodnegār was forged by Kāve for the Legendary Persian Prince Milad. After Milad's death in the 7th story of Shahnameh the sword was carefully guarded by Fulad-Zereh, not only because it was a valuable weapon, and indeed the only weapon that could harm the demon, but also because wearing it was a charm against magic. A wound inflicted by this sword could only be treated by a special potion made from a number of ingredients, including Fulad-Zereh's brain.

References
Encyclopaedia Iranica

Mythological swords
Middle Eastern swords
Individual weapons
Persian literature
Persian mythology
Iranian folklore
Solomon